The Union of Methodist and Waldensian Churches is an Italian united Protestant denomination.

It was founded in 1975 upon the union of the Waldensian Evangelical Church (a Calvinist church with pre-Reformation roots) and the Methodist Evangelical Church in Italy.

It has 50,000 members (45,000 Waldensians, of whom 30,000 in Italy and some 15,000 divided between Argentina and Uruguay, and 5,000 Methodists) and it is member of both the World Communion of Reformed Churches (as Waldensian Evangelical Church) and of the World Methodist Council (as Methodist Evangelical Church).

It is a founding member of the Federation of Evangelical Churches in Italy, an ecumenical body representing Italian historical Protestant denominations. The denomination voted, in 2010, to bless same-gender couples.

See also

Religion in Italy
Christianity in Italy
Protestantism in Italy
List of Italian religious minority politicians

References

External links
 

Protestantism in Italy
Waldensianism
Methodist denominations
Members of the World Council of Churches
United and uniting churches
Religious organisations based in Italy
Christian organizations established in 1975
Methodist denominations established in the 20th century